Norton is an independent city in the Commonwealth of Virginia, located in the far western tip of the state in Wise County, Virginia. As of the 2020 census, the population was 3,687, making it the least populous city in Virginia. The Bureau of Economic Analysis combines the city of Norton with surrounding Wise County for statistical purposes.

History
The settlement was originally known as "Prince's Flats," but in a bid to convince the Louisville and Nashville Railroad to build a depot there, the town was renamed after the then-current head of the railroad, Eckstein Norton.  Norton was located on the Wilderness Trail, which had been blazed by Daniel Boone, and later extensively mapped and settled by Christopher Gist. The settlement developed as a central hub for the timber trade until the coal boom of the 1830-40s.

The Hotel Norton is listed on the National Register of Historic Places.

Geography
Norton is located along the Powell and Guest Rivers.  The entire area of Norton lies within the confines of Wise County, but is not a part of the county.

Major highways

Demographics

2020 census

Note: the US Census treats Hispanic/Latino as an ethnic category. This table excludes Latinos from the racial categories and assigns them to a separate category. Hispanics/Latinos can be of any race.

2000 Census
As of the census of 2000, there were 3,904 people, 1,730 households, and 1,067 families residing in the city.  The population density was 518.5 people per square mile (200.2/km2).  There were 1,946 housing units at an average density of 258.4 per square mile (99.8/km2).  The racial makeup of the city was 91.57% White, 6.15% Black, 0.08% Native American, 1.00% Asian, 0.13% Pacific Islander, 0.18% from other races, and 0.90% from two or more races. Hispanic or Latino of any race were 0.87% of the population.

There were 1,730 households, out of which 26.1% had children under the age of 18 living with them, 43.0% were married couples living together, 15.7% had a female householder with no husband present, and 38.3% were non-families. 34.9% of all households were made up of individuals, and 14.3% had someone living alone who was 65 years of age or older.  The average household size was 2.23 and the average family size was 2.88.

In the city, the population was spread out, with 21.8% under the age of 18, 10.2% from 18 to 24, 27.3% from 25 to 44, 25.4% from 45 to 64, and 15.3% who were 65 years of age or older.  The median age was 39 years. For every 100 females, there were 81.8 males.  For every 100 females age 18 and over, there were 78.5 males.

The median income for a household in the city was $22,788, and the median income for a family was $30,889. Males had a median income of $30,000 versus $23,229 for females. The per capita income for the city was $16,024.  About 19.1% of families and 22.8% of the population were below the poverty line, including 35.7% of those under age 18 and 12.1% of those age 65 or over.

Government

The city of Norton is located in the 9th congressional district, currently served by Morgan Griffith. For state government, Norton lies in the 1st House district (Terry Kilgore) and the 38th Senate district (Travis Hackworth, previously Ben Chafin, who died from COVID-19 complications). 

Since 2004, Norton has reliably voted for the Republican candidate for President, increasing to forty percent margins in both 2016 and 2020. 

In 2021, Norton voted for Glenn Youngkin over Terry McAuliffe at a greater than forty-five percent margin.

Education
Norton City Schools is the school division of the city, operating John I. Burton High School and Norton Elementary and Middle School.

Notable people 
 Dock Boggs – musician and songwriter
 Vernon Crawford "Jack" Cooke – bluegrass musician

References

External links
City of Norton

 
Cities in Virginia
Populated places established in 1894
Southwest Virginia
1894 establishments in Virginia